Caloptilia violacella is a moth of the family Gracillariidae. It is known from Illinois, Missouri, Florida, Georgia, Kentucky, Maine, Maryland, New York and Texas in the United States.

The wingspan is about 10 mm.

The larvae feed on Cajanus cajan, Desmodium species (including Desmodium rotundifolium) and Meibomia dillenii. They mine the leaves of their host plant.

References

External links
Caloptilia at microleps.org
mothphotographersgroup
Bug Guide

violacella
Moths of North America
Moths described in 1860